The Henschel Hs 117 Schmetterling (German for Butterfly) was a radio-guided German surface-to-air missile project developed during World War II. There was also an air-to-air version, the Hs 117H.

Development 
In 1941, Professor Herbert A. Wagner (who was previously responsible for the Henschel Hs 293 anti-ship missile) invented the Schmetterling missile and submitted it to the Reich Air Ministry (RLM), who rejected the design because there was no need for more anti-aircraft weaponry.

However, by 1943 the large-scale bombing of Germany caused the RLM to change its mind, and Henschel was given a contract to develop and manufacture it. The team was led by Professor Wagner, and it produced a weapon somewhat resembling a bottlenose dolphin with swept wings and cruciform tail.

In May 1944, 59 Hs 117 missiles were tested, some from beneath a Heinkel He 111; over half the trials failed. Mass production was ordered in December 1944, with deployment to start in March 1945. Operational missiles were to be launched from a 37mm gun carriage.

In January 1945, a prototype for mass production was completed, and production of 3,000 missiles a month was anticipated, but on 6 February, SS-Obergruppenführer Hans Kammler cancelled the project.

Variants 
The Hs 117H was an air-launched variant, designed to be launched from a Dornier Do 217, Junkers Ju 188, or Junkers Ju 388.

See also

References

External links

 Henschel Hs117 Schmettering (Butterfly) - Royal Air Force Museum, Cosford (UK)
 German language page on the Hs 117 Schmetterling SAM missile

World War II guided missiles of Germany
Surface-to-air missiles of Germany